The Liberty Model P-2, also called the Liberty Model A, was a two-seat parasol wing monoplane built by the Liberty Aircraft Sales & Mfg Co of St.Louis, Missouri.

Design
The P-2 was a strut-braced parasol wing aircraft with conventional landing gear and side-by-side seating in an open cockpit. The wings used wood spars and aluminum ribs with aircraft fabric covering. The tailplane was adjustable.

Specifications (P-2)

References

Parasol-wing aircraft
Single-engined tractor aircraft